Stefan Karlsson (born 5 November 1955) is a retired badminton player from Sweden who competed at the highest world level. He later changed name to Stefan Mellgård.

Career 
Though he played Thomas Cup singles for Sweden and won the Swedish national singles title twice, his greatest successes came in doubles. He won men's doubles at the biennial European Championships twice, with Claes Nordin in 1980 and with Thomas Kihlström in 1982. In 1983 he shared the prestigious All-England men's doubles title with Kihlström. He won the silver medal at the 1985 IBF World Championships in mixed doubles with Maria Bengtsson.

Achievements

World Games 
Men's doubles

World Championships 
Mixed doubles

European Championships 
Men's doubles

IBF World Grand Prix 
The World Badminton Grand Prix sanctioned by International Badminton Federation (IBF) from 1983 to 2006.

Men's doubles

References 

1955 births
Living people
Swedish male badminton players
World Games medalists in badminton
World Games silver medalists
Competitors at the 1981 World Games